WIPC (1280 AM) is a radio station broadcasting a Spanish Christian format. Licensed to Lake Wales, Florida, United States, the station serves the Lakeland area.  The station is currently owned by Super W Media Group, Inc.  It uses the slogan, "La Señal Refrescante" or the refreshing signal.

By day, WIPC broadcasts at 1,000 watts, but to avoid interference with other stations on 1280 AM, at night it reduces power to 150 watts. It uses a non-directional antenna at all times.  Programming is also heard on 250-watt FM translator W245DO at 96.9 MHz in Lake Wales.

History
The station went on the air as WKZJ on May 1, 1989. On March 1, 1990, the station changed its call sign to the current WIPC.

References

External links

IPC
Radio stations established in 1989
1989 establishments in Florida